Peru competed at the 2000 Summer Olympics in Sydney, Australia. Volleyball player Rosa García was the flagbearer.

Athletics

Men
Field events

Women
Track and road events

Diving

Men

Judo

Men

Sailing

Men

Shooting

Men

Swimming

Men

Women

Volleyball

Women's Competition
Preliminary round (group B)
 Lost to Russia (0-3)
 Lost to Italy (0-3)
 Lost to Germany (0-3) 
 Lost to South Korea (1-3)
 Lost to Cuba (1-3) → did not advance, 11th place overall
Team roster
Fiorella Aita
Milagros Camere
Leyla Chihuán
Iris Falcón
Rosa García
Elena Keldibekova
Natalia Málaga
Milagros Moy
Diana Soto
Milagros Uceda
Janet Vasconzuelo
Yulissa Zamudio
Head coach: Kim Man-Bok

See also
 Peru at the 1999 Pan American Games

References

sports-reference

Nations at the 2000 Summer Olympics
2000 Summer Olympics
Summer Olympics